The Berggruen Institute is a Los Angeles-based think tank founded by Nicolas Berggruen.

History 
In 2010, Nicolas Berggruen and Nathan Gardels sat down with a group of academics, business leaders, and political veterans in California to discuss the economic and political stresses caused by the global financial crisis, the widespread perception of failing political institutions and Western democracies, and how China's rise would affect the international landscape in the 21st century. The ideas that emerged from those original discussions became the foundation for the Berggruen Institute through the launch of local and global initiatives and the publication of Intelligent Governance for the 21st Century: A Middle Way Between West and East, a Financial Times "Best Book of the Year.”

In January 2014, the institute created The WorldPost, a not-for-profit, online global publication which began publishing through the Washington Post platform in 2018. Concurrently, the institute also formed a new partnership with the University of California Press to publish a new book series on the great transformations. In 2019, the Berggruen and Gardels co-authored their second book together, Renovating Democracy: Governing in the Age of Globalization and Digital Capitalism, as a continuance of the UC Press Great Transformations series.

In 2015, the institute expanded its mission with the creation of its Berggruen Fellowship Program, which sponsors thinkers working to develop new ideas for addressing the great transformations.

Berggruen Institute councils and committees 
The Berggruen Institute is committed to proposing and implementing new ideas of effective governance through three of its projects: the 21st Century Council, the Council for the Future of Europe, and the Think Long Committee for California.

Through these projects, the institute worked closely with German and French labor ministers to develop a youth jobs plan for Europe; organized repeat delegations of government and industry leaders in a meeting with Chinese President Xi Jinping, Premier Li Keqiang and other Chinese leadership to foster an open dialogue and better understanding between China and the West; and passed the California SB 1253 Ballot Initiative Transparency Act, strengthening the integrity of the state's initiative process.

21st Century Council
The 21st Century Council brings together former heads of state, global thinkers and entrepreneurs from across cultural and political boundaries to address the problems arising from power shifts from Western-dominated globalization to a multipolar world. The council is devoted to global governance reform with the aim to "build on a convergence of interests in order to create a community of interests." The council is chaired by former president of Mexico Ernesto Zedillo.

Council on the Future of Europe
The Council on the Future of Europe is a committee engaged in research, debate and advocacy to move forward the project of a united Europe. It advocates not only a fiscal and political union within Europe but also the engagement of European citizens. It supports "town hall" meetings and seminars to provide a forum for Council members and European leaders to bring their ideas to the public. The council hosted an annual Town Hall (2012–2015) series to foster an ongoing dialogue on how to best address Europe's most pressing issues, including economic expansion, jobs and opportunities for youth, labor mobility and migration, and expanding democratic foundation of the union.

In May 2013, the council held a "town hall" meeting endorsed by the French President Francois Hollande, Spanish Prime Minister Mariano Rajoy, and Italian labor minister. The council and Germany's labor minister, Ursula von der Leyen, proposed an investment, training, and jobs program for Europe. The program eventually became a part of European policy in January 2015 when European Commission President Jean-Claude Juncker proposed the 315 billion euro Investment Plan.

The Think Long Committee for California
The Think Long Committee for California promotes a comprehensive approach for improving California's government. It has involved a politically bi-partisan board from the outset.  In November 2011, the Committee published its report, A Blueprint to Renew California. The report recommended the devolution of power to local governments and school districts, reform of the democracy initiative process to ensure greater consideration of measures proposed by the public, establishment of a "rainy day" fund for economic downturns, a body of long-term oversight to balance the short-term, special-interest character of the elected legislature, and modernization of California's tax system.

In 2014, the committee helped promote SB 1253, "The Ballot Initiative Transparency Act," eventually approved on September 28, 2014. It increase the opportunities for public comment, and allows lawmakers and proponents to make changes before ballot initiatives go to the voters.  The committee also supported Proposition 2 in 2014, "The Rainy Day Fund," which sets aside a small percentage of revenue each year to pay the state's debt and safeguard against economic downturns.

The LA Committee 
The LA Committee, introduced in 2016, is made up of Los Angeles and California residents from across sectors whose aim is to assist the institute in building a community of support and creating impactful programs in Los Angeles. The committee is chaired by Geoffrey Cowan, the founding president of Annenberg Foundation Trust at Sunnylands.

Sense LA 
The Sense LA program was unveiled in 2019 to be a tool for social cohesion and public participation in Los Angeles using the power of art and the city's collective intelligence. In September 2019 it launched its first project with the Korean American Federation to develop formal and actionable recommendations for the city's master urban plan, a field test in participatory representative democracy. Sense LA is led by Berggruen fellow Gabriel Kahan.

Berggruen Institute programs and work 
The institute's core work is done through its four programs: Future Humans, The Future of Capitalism, The Future of Democracy, and Geopolitics and Globalization. Additionally, the Global Fellowship Program enables thinkers to study globally in different areas of the world. In 2016, the Berggruen Prize, an annual one million dollar award, was unveiled.

Future Humans 
Life, intelligence, body, matter, mind: such concepts are undergoing great transformations. From biotechnologies that rearrange DNA to create new life forms, to computers that learn to respond to human emotions and anticipate the most intimate desires, to space telescopes that reveal a universe percolating with strange particles and perhaps soon other sentient beings, we interact with and design technologies that unsettle our notions of nature, including human nature. These transformations thus prompt us to consider the diversity of possible futures for humans in connection with other beings, biologies, and the biosphere.

“Future Humans" is a new Berggruen Institute research area that will collaboratively and creatively ask: How can we construct a flourishing ecosystem with AI, humans, and the planet? What sorts of novel fragilities will we encounter in a world of rapidly transforming but ineluctable interconnection? And how must we radically rethink human-driven institutions (politics, society, the economy, and so on) in the face of these dramatic changes?

Launching in Fall 2022, this interdisciplinary program will unite experimentalists, creators, and scholars who will not only track, but also shape, how humans of the future will collaborate with forecasted natures and technologies.

The Future of Capitalism Program 
The Future of Capitalism program seeks to envision new models and mechanisms for managing and legitimating market economies while addressing the current environmental and distributional challenges. It has two main programs: the Universal Basic Assets program which explores ways to equip individuals with universal access to an asset base that is mutually administered and distributes benefits to its stakeholders and the New Political Economy program which explores innovative proposals for how leaders at all different levels of governance can best respond to and reshape globalized capitalism. The Future of Capitalism program is led by its first associate director, Dr. Yakov Feygin, who works closely with Nils Gilman, the vice president of programs at the institute.

The Future of Democracy Program 
The Future of Democracy program brings together thoughtful leaders and leading thinkers to re-imagine democracy for the new era to develop new ideas for how to reinvent democratic institutions and rebuild the public square for the 21st century.

Geopolitics and Globalization Program 
The Geopolitics and Globalization Program, home to the 21st Century Council, focuses on two projects: Thriving in a Transactional International Order, which is aimed at building a forward-looking model of the international system that focuses on liberal outcomes without relying on the revival of anachronistic institutions, and Promoting US-China Dialogue on AI & Security, which is responsible for the three “Understanding China” conferences in Beijing since its inception.

Global Fellowship Program
The Fellowship Program is a two-year program that gives scholars the opportunity to study at academic institutions all over the world.

Berggruen Prize

The Berggruen Institute presented its first Berggruen Prize for Philosophy and Culture in 2016. The million-dollar award, chosen by an independent jury, is given annually to a thinker whose ideas are of broad significance for shaping human self-understanding and the advancement of humanity.

The inaugural recipient in 2016 was Charles Taylor, one of the world's foremost philosophers who has deepened the understanding among different intellectual traditions and civilizations. The 2017 laureate was Onora O’Neill. A broad-ranging philosopher of politics and ethics, international justice and bioethics, O’Neill is a Professor Emerita of Philosophy at the University of Cambridge and the former chair of the Equality and Human Rights Commission in Great Britain.

In 2018, the Prize was awarded to author and public philosopher Martha C. Nussbaum to recognize her ability to use the power of literature and the classical world to help global audiences understand vulnerability—particularly the emotions in moral and political life—and the conditions for human wellbeing and happiness.

The 2019 Berggruen Prize was awarded to U.S. Supreme Court Justice Ruth Bader Ginsburg for her work in pioneering gender equality and using the law to advance ethical and philosophical principles of equality and human rights.

Berggruen China Center 
In June 2018, the Berggruen Institute announced plans to house a China Center at Peking University, an interdisciplinary research center founded with the aim to foster more cross-cultural dialogue. It houses fellows, and offers symposia and conferences.

Noema Magazine 
In 2014, Berggruen Institute created a global media platform, The WorldPost, and partnered with HuffPost to publish The WorldPost on its HuffPost platform. Later in 2017, Berggruen Institute announced a partnership with The Washington Post to publish The WorldPost content only on Washington Post as a media platform that included op-eds, videos, and features by writers around the world.

Then in 2020, The WorldPost turned into a digital and print magazine and was named Noema Magazine. Noema publishes essays, interviews, reportage, videos, and art on several topics including culture, technology, philosophy, governance, geopolitics, and economics. As of 2021, Nathan Gardels is editor in chief of Noema, and Kathleen Miles is the executive editor.

Berggruen Institute Scholar's Campus: Monteverdi 
The Berggruen Institute is planning a new Scholars’ Campus in the Santa Monica Mountains, above the Getty Center. The campus, designed by a team of architects led by Herzog and de Meuron and L.A's Gensler, will house the institute's educational programs, fellowships and scholars.

References

Think tanks based in the United States
Think tanks established in 2010
2010 establishments in California
Non-profit organizations based in Los Angeles